Iswarati Center for Badminton Learning (ICBL) - This is a school of Badminton opened by famous former three-times Indian National Badminton Champion and two-times Olympian 
Mr. Dipankar Bhattacharjee in Guwahati, Assam, India. This training center is specially created to train the  youths of Assam and North-Eastern India. It is a private non-profit association and created by Dipankar himself.

It is started as an association in 2004 at Guwahati with the support of few interested people
morally backing Dipankar in his efforts.

Dipankar has unsuccessfully approached many sponsors like the big businesses in the area. 
But he is pursuing support from sponsors in the future to make this effort successful.

Dipankar takes care of coaching the students at a regular basis. The players are promised 
with bright future in the national and international badminton arena.

Dipankar feels that this Academy for Badminton learning is a very important step for the
future of Badminton in Assam, North-East India, and India as a whole. There are ongoing
efforts by authorities of Badminton like International Badminton Federation (IBF) to popularize
badminton and draw more sponsors and fans into it. Dipankar also believes in these efforts
and he is doing his part to contribute to the future success of making Badminton a much more entertaining
and popular sports. He is constantly approaching potential sponsors in Assam and N.E. India
as well as from other neighbouring states. He is optimistic that there will be growing attention
towards Badminton and more interest from the big companies who already advertise their brand through
other sports like Cricket and Tennis in India.

He has been one of the first member at BPL Prakash Padukone Academy in Bangalore and had
the fortune of training with Prakash. His association with Prakash has given him more hopes in
venturing out in popularizing Badminton and training talented youths of the oft-neglected
region of Assam and the North-East India.

Organizational structure
President:
Shri, P. K. Deb, Adviser Transport & Communication, North-Eastern Council, Shillong

Vice Presidents: 
Shri Iswar Bhattacharjee (Retd. PWD Executive Engineer)
Shri Dilip Biswas
Shri Pradip Hazarika

General Secretary: 
Shri Dipankar Bhattacharjee

Treasurer: 
Shri Biswajit Ghosh

Jt. Secretaries: 
Shri Arup Buragohain
Shri Arup Das
Shri Parasmoni Deka

References

External links
Official website

Badminton in India
Sport in Assam